Split Enz were a New Zealand rock band formed in Auckland in 1972 by Tim Finn and Phil Judd. The band underwent many lineup changes, with sixteen members across their twelve year history. Originally started as a folk-oriented group with quirky art rock stylings, the band built a strong regional following, noted for their outlandish costumes, makeup and theatrical performances. After three singles, the band released their first album, Mental Notes, in 1975, which displayed strong progressive rock elements. The group's third album, 1977's Dizrythmia, was the first without Judd, with Tim Finn's brother Neil replacing him on guitar and eventually as co-lead vocalist and songwriter, after which the band came to embrace a more streamlined and pop-oriented approach and became pioneers of new wave. The band achieved worldwide indie stardom in the 1980s, with particular success in New Zealand, Australia and Canada.

The band experienced its greatest success in the early 1980s, with the albums True Colours (1980), Waiata (1981) and Time and Tide (1982) reaching number one in New Zealand and Australia and producing the hit singles "I Got You" (a New Zealand and Australian number-one), "One Step Ahead", "History Never Repeats", "Dirty Creature" and "Six Months in a Leaky Boat". The band also earned a cult following in North America and Europe, with its music videos entering heavy rotation in the early years of MTV. After Tim Finn left the band to start a solo career, Neil Finn became its sole leader for their tenth and final studio album See Ya 'Round (1984), with Split Enz officially breaking up after their last show on 4 December 1984. Neil Finn and Australian drummer Paul Hester, who joined Split Enz in 1983, went on to collaborate in a new band called the Mullanes, later known as Crowded House.

In total, Split Enz had 10 albums (including seven studio albums) reach the top 10 of the Official New Zealand Music Chart. It has had eight songs listed in the APRA Top 100 New Zealand Songs of All Time, more than any other band.

Career

The New Zealand years
In late 1972, university friends Tim Finn and Phil Judd founded a largely acoustic band called Split Ends in Auckland, New Zealand. Finn sang and played piano, while Judd sang and played guitar. Both wrote songs. They were accompanied by Tim's old school friend Mike Chunn on bass, Miles Golding on violin, and Mike Howard on flute. Finn and Judd quickly became close friends; after moving out of their campus accommodation they shared Room 129 in a rambling boarding house called "Malmsbury Villa" and both their room number and the name of the house would later both be commemorated in song. Another key personality in this period was Phil Judd's university friend Noel Crombie, who occasionally performed with them over the next few years. Another powerful creative influence was Phil and Tim's love for British author and artist Mervyn Peake, whose Gormenghast novels inspired a number of their early songs.

Originally named "Split Ends" they were an odd and eclectic mix for a pop band, Golding having been educated in classical music and Finn influenced by the Beatles, the Move, and the Kinks. At the beginning of 1973 they added drummer Div Vercoe and, with financial backing from friend and fan Barry Coburn (who became the band's original manager), they issued their first single, "For You"/"Split Ends", in April that year, undertaking their first tour shortly after, a short tour supporting British blues legend John Mayall. It was at this point that Golding and Vercoe left the band. Mike Chunn wanted the band to become electric, so guitarist Wally Wilkinson was brought in alongside Chunn's brother Geoff on drums. During rehearsals with the new lineup, Howard also departed. By this time Split Ends had become Tim's primary focus and he dropped out of university to concentrate on the band.

In late 1973 Split Ends entered the New Faces television talent contest, and in preparation for their performance they recorded two new Judd-Finn songs: "129" and "Home Sweet Home". Soon after, they also recorded "Sweet Talkin' Spoon Song", which would become the second single. In the event – and much to the dismay of the Finn family watching at home – Split Ends finished second-last in the contest. Although this first television appearance was not recorded by TVNZ, the Finn family still have the shaky, silent 8mm black and white home movie footage they shot directly off the TV screen and a portion of that was later included in the Split Enz documentary Spellbound. Despite their loss on New Faces, the group made a sufficiently strong impression to secure them a 30-minute concert special for Television New Zealand, which was recorded soon after. Typical of the time, the performances were mimed to pre-recorded backing tracks, so the band put down four more songs including "No Bother To Me", "Malmsbury Villa" and "Spellbound". Still billed as "Split Ends", in November 1973 EMI NZ issued the band's second single, "129" / "Sweet Talking Spoon Song".  Shortly after the release of this single, the group altered its name to the punningly patriotic Split Enz.

Over the next eighteen months Split Enz honed their material and performances. The TV special exposure enabled them to undertake their first national concert tour, although Phil Judd did not take part. He disliked performing live, was uncomfortable with negative reactions to the band, and also felt that their developing music was too complex for successful stage presentation, so he initially decided to stay at home to write and record new material while the rest of the band toured.

In early 1974 the group's sound took a major step forward when Tim acquired a Mellotron and in February saxophonist Robert Gillies and keyboardist Eddie Rayner joined the band. Rayner's accomplished playing soon became a crucial part of the group's sound (and also allowed Tim to step out from behind the keyboard). Early in their career, the group made the decision to treat records, live shows, publicity photos, stage design, costumes, hair and even makeup as a total package and this was greatly assisted by their wide-ranging interests in literature and the visual arts: Judd was already an accomplished painter and subsequently created cover paintings for two Enz albums. His artist friend Noel Crombie was soon roped in to become the group's "stylist" and went on to create the unusual costumes, hairstyles, makeup and stage sets which soon became their trademark, as well as coordinating all their single and album artwork and associated promotional material (such as buttons and  posters), and he directed all their music videos.

In early 1974 Split Enz undertook a series of radio-sponsored "Buck-A-Head" ($1 per head entry) shows which played in theatres rather than in pubs or clubs. Taking advantage of this, Phil and Tim decided that, rather than slogging it out on the traditional pub circuit, they would now only perform in theatres and concert halls, which were better suited to the band's unique performance style and enabled them to stage a full theatrical presentation. Under Noel Crombie's guidance the band developed elaborate sets, costumes, hairstyles and makeup, and performances were punctuated by odd happenings. At one concert, they brought Rayner's auntie on stage to perform an impromptu tap dance during one of the songs and this was a great success, but they realised that they couldn't really take her on tour with them, so Crombie's spoon playing routine was substituted and soon became an essential part of each show. For an early NZ TV performance with a "desert island" theme they brought in a load of sand and created a miniature indoor beach, complete with palm trees and a wading pool, with band members dressed as hankie-hatted tourists, reclining on deck chairs and sipping drinks. For another now-legendary live performance of their live epic "Stranger Than Fiction", a female friend was recruited to crawl across the stage during the song, under pulsing strobe lights, with a bloodied axe apparently embedded in her skull.

Encouraged by a triumphant live concert on this tour, Judd decided to return to live performance. The Buck-A-Head tour finished in May 1974, and the next month both Geoff Chunn and Rob Gillies left the band. Emlyn Crowther (ex-Orb) replaced Chunn on drums in July, but Gillies was not replaced at this time. Shortly after, Noel Crombie became a full member of the band, providing percussion.

Move to Australia: 1974–1976
By the end of 1974 their fanbase in New Zealand, although small, was extremely strong and very dedicated, but the chances of further progress in that small market were obviously limited. In March 1975, the band issued its third single, "No Bother To Me", on the independent White Cloud label, and a few weeks later, Split Enz became the latest in a string of successful NZ groups and solo artists who moved to Australia to further their career. Although their highly unusual visual presentation and complex music were markedly out of step with the blues-based "pub rock" that was dominating Australian music at the time, and many concert-goers were puzzled by them, the band's powerful performances and the quality of their material impressed and as in New Zealand they soon acquired a small but fiercely loyal fan base. After nine months on the Australian pub and concert circuit they were spotted by Melbourne-based entrepreneur Michael Gudinski, who signed them to his new Mushroom Records label, which was then enjoying unprecedented success with the band Skyhooks, whose 1974 debut album had shot to the top of the charts, spawning a string of hit singles and becoming the highest-selling Australian LP ever released up to that time. Thanks to Gudinski's associated booking agency (Consolidated Rock) Split Enz were soon touring nationally and gaining valuable exposure playing prestigious support slots for several major international acts including Flo & Eddie, Lou Reed and Roxy Music.

In May 1975 the group went into Festival Records' Studio 24 in Sydney to record their first album, which was produced by their tour manager of the time, David Russell, a veteran NZ  rock/pop musician who had previously played with Ray Columbus & The Invaders, Ray Brown and the New Whispers and Max Merritt & the Meteors. Their debut LP Mental Notes (Mushroom, 1975) did remarkably well, selling 12,000 copies on its first release and going to #19 on the Australian album chart and #7 in New Zealand. Not long after the album was released Wally Wilkinson was sacked and Rob Gillies returned to the band.

The UK years: 1976–1980
Following Split Enz' support slot on Roxy Music's first Australian tour, Roxy guitarist Phil Manzanera offered to produce their second album. With support from Manzanera and Gudinski, the band secured a UK recording deal with Chrysalis Records and they flew to the UK to record Second Thoughts (Mushroom, 1976) at the Basing Street Studios in London. Second Thoughts was issued in Australia in July 1976, and in the UK (as Mental Notes) in September. It comprised four re-arranged and re-recorded tracks from Mental Notes, four new songs, including their latest single "Late Last Night", and a new version of one of the earliest Judd-Finn compositions, "129", retitled "Matinee Idyll (129)". This song was released, backed by "Lovey Dovey", as a single in December 1976 and during the recording they were able to meet up with their old bandmate Miles Golding, then living in London, at a recital he gave at the Australian Embassy.

To promote the album they toured as support to English folk-rockers Jack the Lad. In November 1976 Emlyn Crowther was sacked and replaced by British drummer Malcolm Green.

The band's next single was the non-album track "Another Great Divide", released to promote their return to Australia/New Zealand in January 1977 for the "Courting the Act" tour. Like in the UK Second Thoughts was titled Mental Notes when Chrysalis released the album in the US, and at the end of February they set off for the US to support the album. The 23 day/40 show tour was a first attempt to establish themselves in America but it marked the end of an era in the band and proved to be the last tour with founding members Phil Judd and Mike Chunn. Chunn decided to leave at the end of the US tour, partly because he wanted to spend more time with his family but also because he suffered from agoraphobia. But tensions were also increasing between Phil and Tim. Although the band received a standing ovation in San Francisco, audience reactions in more remote areas ranged from puzzlement to outright hostility, and Phil was extremely sensitive to such negative reactions. Also like Mike Chunn he had a young family back in New Zealand and was tired of the endless grind of touring. The tensions climaxed after a concert when Phil, who was having trouble with an out-of-tune guitar, stormed off before the end of the set and when Tim challenged him backstage about what had happened, Phil punched him. The tour ended in April, and Phil left the band. They were due to begin their third English tour later that month, so Tim now took charge and hastily reorganised the group. On 4 April English bassist Nigel Griggs (ex-Octopus) was hired to replace Mike Chunn, who gave Tim a crucial piece of parting advice—he suggested Tim's younger brother Neil as the replacement for Phil Judd. At the time Neil was playing in local Auckland band Afterhours, led by Geoff Chunn, plus Neil and Mark Hough, (aka Buster Stiggs who later joined The Swingers with Phil Judd). Neil flew to England as soon as he received the call from Tim and he officially joined Split Enz on 7 April 1977.

Split Enz' third album was recorded at London's AIR Studios with producer (and former Beatles engineer) Geoff Emerick from June to July 1977. Dizrythmia (a title taken from the medical term for jet-lag, circadian dysrhythmia, meaning 'upset body rhythm') made no appreciable impact in the UK, but was very successful in Australasia, and gave them their first simultaneous hits on the Australian and New Zealand singles and album charts. They returned to Australia in August, coinciding with the release of the album, and began a 28-date tour Australasian tour in October/November. The album reached #18 in Australia. The first single, "My Mistake" (August), peaked at #18 during October, bolstered by the national tour and aided by another distinctive promotional video. In New Zealand Dizrhythmia reached #3, and "My Mistake" peaked at #21. The second single, "Bold as Brass"  (December), which failed to chart in Australia, was accompanied by another specially-made video, co-directed by Noel and Rob.

Between November 1977 and February 1978 Split Enz toured solidly throughout the UK and Europe. At the turn of the year Rob Gillies left and despite their earlier falling out, Phil Judd returned, briefly, in early 1978 after Tim and Eddie heard some of his new material, but he apparently felt uncomfortable with their changing musical direction and style, and left the band for good about a month later. The Enz struggled to survive through 1978: they lost their Chrysalis contract and spent most of that year without a UK record deal, a booking agent or a manager. Debts mounted and, unable to get gigs, they were forced to go on the dole, but they continued writing new material and rehearsing constantly. It was at this point that the New Zealand Arts Council came to the rescue with a grant of $5000. This crucial break allowed them to book a tiny 8-track studio in Luton and with the help of 18-year-old English engineer David Tickle they made demos of 28 new songs in less than five days. These sessions—known as the Rootin Tootin Luton Tapes—became the basis for the group's new direction. One of Tim's new songs from these sessions – which showed the clear influence of British punk and New Wave – became their next single, "I See Red".

Split Enz entered Manor Studios in November 1978 to record a new album with producer Mallory Earl. The cover of Frenzy signalled the changes in the group—the wild costumes, hair and makeup were gone, and Phil Judd's painting depicted them in casual clothes, standing in front of a farm shed in a pastoral New Zealand landscape. The album included re-recordings of many songs from the Luton tapes, but the band felt that Earl had not fully captured the raw energy of the Luton demos. Many of the other Luton songs were never re-recorded, and were left as demos, although some eventually surfaced on A&M's American version of Frenzy, released in North America in 1981. The same month, Mushroom issued "I See Red" as a single in Australia. It marked a significant move away from the band's earlier and more 'progressive' style and harked back to Tim's first love—simple, concise, accessible, high-energy guitar-based power pop. Although it didn't chart in the United Kingdom, "I See Red" gained a lot of critical attention and considerable airplay, and is credited as being the song that began the turn-around in their reputation in the UK.

The group went home to New Zealand for Christmas 1978 and before they headed back to the UK, they decided to play some local shows. Just after Christmas there was a serious setback when their equipment was destroyed in a suspicious fire at a rehearsal studio. Using borrowed equipment, Split Enz played what proved to be a pivotal concert in their later career, stunning friends and fans alike with their now-legendary performance at the second Nambassa Festival in January. "I See Red" eventually peaked at #15 in Australia in February 1979, and was followed by another historic release – "Give It a Whirl" (May 1979) – the first Enz single to be written by Neil Finn. Neither Frenzy nor "Give It A Whirl" charted, but one album track, "She Got Body She Got Soul", was later reworked for the soundtrack to the musical feature film Starstruck. A self-produced, non-album single "Things" / "Semi-Detached" was released in October but failed to chart. The following month The Beginning of the Enz, an album composed of pre-Mental Notes singles and demos, was issued.

Breakthrough and commercial success: 1980–1984

For their next album, David Tickle was brought to Australia to produce. The result, True Colours, also marked the emergence of Neil as a significant pop songwriter. His song "I Got You" seems in retrospect an obvious choice as a first single although Mushroom didn't think there was a commercial track on the record, and that they had wasted their $A34,000 budget. Nevertheless, it proved to be a massive hit that finally established the group in the front rank of bands in Australasia. True Colours and "I Got You" were simultaneously released in January 1980 and simultaneously topped charts in both Australia and New Zealand during March – the album stayed at #1 in Australia for ten weeks, and the single for eight weeks and "I Got You" went on to become the highest selling single in Australia for the year – and the biggest international success of the band's career.

The band and management developed the entire marketing campaign, which included several 'world firsts' – they released a VHS video album (the first of its kind) Split Enz Live in Concert, featuring live performances of most of the True Colours songs and some select earlier material, and released each new pressing of the LP in different coloured jackets, designed by band member Noel Crombie including once released in the US, a special laser-etched edition, courtesy Jeff Ayeroff of A&M. This version harnessed laser technology to etch geometric patterns into the playing surface of the album, creating prismatic effects without affecting the music playback. True Colours was a huge commercial success and went on to sell over 250,000 copies in Australasia. A&M issued the album in the UK, Canada and the USA. "I Got You" reached #12 on the UK charts during August and True Colours reached #42. The next single, "I Hope I Never" (b/w "Hypnotised" and "Carried Away") was released in May and reached #18 on the Australian charts during June. Videos for "I Got You" and "I Hope I Never" enjoyed airplay on video music shows in America, and the band played both songs on American television shows such as Fridays (10 Oct 1980). In the UK Chrysalis Records capitalised on the success of "I Got You" by issuing a compilation album Beginning of the Enz, comprising tracks from Second Thoughts and Dizrythmia as well as the 1977 non-album single "Another Great Divide". Despite its title, this album bore no relation to the 1979 album of the same name.

The group toured extensively behind True Colours before returning to the studio in late 1980. Their next album was released in Australia only as Corroboree and everywhere else as Waiata (Maori for "songs"). It continued the winning streak initiated by True Colours but their relationship with producer David Tickle had become strained and it would be their last collaboration. Notably A&M Records refusal to release Waiata in America with Noel's Maori-inspired original white-brown-black cover design (reportedly protesting that "brown is the colour of shit") and much to Noel's chagrin, they changed it to a feeble pastel blue, completely ruining the effect. Although it was not as well received by critics, the album gave Split Enz their second joint Australian and New Zealand #1 LP, led by Neil's "One Step Ahead" (#5 in November) and "History Never Repeats" (#4 in April 1981). The album's third single, Tim's "I Don't Wanna Dance" (June) failed to chart but "History Never Repeats" reached #63 in the UK during May.

It was also at this same time that Split Enz founder Phil Judd re-emerged with his new band The Swingers and scored a huge Australian/New Zealand #1 hit with their second single "Counting The Beat" produced by David Tickle, who produced the Enz albums True Colours and Waiata. Internal tensions saw drummer Mal Green leave Split Enz in mid-1981 to work on solo projects; Noel Crombie was promoted from percussionist to drummer and the band began on a world tour including North America, where they co-headlined with Tom Petty & the Heartbreakers.

In late 1981, after months of intensive touring, Split Enz returned to the studio to record what many critics regard as their most personal and creative album, Time and Tide. Much of the material came out of Tim's recent personal turmoil—in January that year he had married English dancer Liz Malam, but the marriage collapsed in October and he suffered a nervous breakdown, an ordeal he recounted in "Six Months in a Leaky Boat" and "Dirty Creature". The album was produced by rising English producer/engineer Hugh Padgham. He was already well known on the music scene for his engineering work with producer Steve Lillywhite on landmark recordings by artists like Peter Gabriel, XTC and Genesis, and he is credited with inventing the "gated reverb" drum sound that became Phil Collins' trademark. Padgham reportedly had a much more relaxed style than Tickle which the Enz found ideally suited them. Released in April 1982, Time and Tide became Split Enz' third successive #1 album in Australia and New Zealand. The advent of MTV in America, and its interest in new wave acts, also helped the band's growing cult status in America, with both "Dirty Creature" and "Six Months in a Leaky Boat" (as well as earlier videos) being given wide airplay on the channel. "Dirty Creature" reached #6 in Australia in April and "Six Months In A Leaky Boat" went to #2 in June. "Never Ceases to Amaze Me" (August) was issued as the third single from the LP but failed to chart.

Initially, "Six Months in a Leaky Boat" also looked like it would at last furnish Split Enz with the breakthrough UK hit that they had been hoping for, but this failed to materialise; after the controversial sinking of the Argentine warship the General Belgrano by the British Navy during the Falklands War the BBC reportedly included the song on a covert "blacklist" of songs that were not to be played on air due to supposedly negative references to the war: although the BBC vehemently denied the blacklist at the time, they finally admitted to its existence in 1999. The year ended with the release of the band's first "Best of" collection Enz of an Era, which went to #8 in Australia (December) and sold 30,000 copies in New Zealand alone.

Early in 1983, Tim took a break from the group to record a solo album with an all-star session group including producers Mark Moffatt (Divinyls, Ross Wilson) former Beach Boy Ricky Fataar, and legendary session singer Venetta Fields. Escapade, released in June, was a major success in Australasia, spawning several hits singles including "Fraction Too Much Friction" and the gospel-styled "Made My Day". Tim won the 'Best Songwriter' gong at that year's TV Week/Countdown Awards, and Split Enz won 'Best Album' (for Time & Tide) and Most Popular Group awards.

In March 1983 Noel Crombie briefly stepped into the limelight and issued a novelty solo single, "My Voice Keeps Changing On Me" and the same month, the new Enz single "Next Exit" was released as a stop-gap until the band could record a new album, but it failed to chart. Up to this time, Tim had been the primary writer in the group, but having used most of his latest songs on Escapade the next LP saw Neil write majority of songs. The aptly titled Conflicting Emotions (November 1983) was less cohesive than the previous three albums, and (perhaps inevitably after three successive #1 LPs) it was a commercial letdown, reaching only #13 on the national chart in January. Nevertheless, Neil's songs fared well commercially — the jazzy "Strait Old Line" (October 1983), the anthemic "Message to My Girl" (January 1984) and "I Wake Up Every Night" (April 1984) all appeared as singles. The lead single "Strait Old Line" was a disappointment on the Australian chart, struggling to #42, but the second single "Message To My Girl" was more impressive and reached #12 in February 1984.

For the "Conflicting Emotions" tour, Tim again felt that the band needed a change in the rhythm section, so Paul Hester (ex-Deckchairs Overboard) was brought in on drums, and Noel returned to percussion (and spoons). However growing tensions between Tim and Neil and his solo success with Escapade eventually led to Tim's decision to leave Split Enz and in June 1984 he ended months of speculation by announcing that he would quit before the next LP was recorded, in order to promote the release of Escapade in Europe.

The remaining members decided to continue, but their next album See Ya 'Round proved to be their last. It came out in November 1984 and was dominated by Neil Finn songs, although the other four members each contributed one song. The first single from the album was Neil's stirring, bittersweet farewell to Split Enz, "I Walk Away" which was released in September. It was followed by the darker "One Mouth Is Fed" in November. By this time the group had finally decided to call it a day, and they reunited with Tim and embarked on the "Enz with a Bang" Australasian farewell tour in October/November 1984. Split Enz played its last show on 4 December 1984 in Auckland. A double album recorded on the farewell tour, The Living Enz, was released in December 1985.

After Split Enz
Neil Finn and drummer Paul Hester founded Crowded House. Tim Finn briefly joined Crowded House later on and also recorded two albums with Neil Finn as the Finn Brothers.

Phil Judd released a solo album and formed the Swingers with Buster Stiggs and Bones Hillman. He also formed Schnell Fenster with Noel Crombie and Nigel Griggs. They were joined by Eddie Rayner, but Rayner left to form The Makers. His group Enzso performed Split Enz songs in an orchestral setting with the New Zealand Symphony Orchestra. Rayner also pursued a solo career. Geoff Chunn and Mike Chunn returned to New Zealand and formed Citizen Band.

In May 2018, Eddie Rayner announced that he was working on a new ENZSO project, titled ENZO, combining classical musicians and a pop ensemble including himself and various ex-Split Enz members.

Reunions
In 1986, two years after Split Enz broke up, they reunited for a Greenpeace benefit concert. Three years later, Crowded House toured with Schnell Fenster, assembling an assortment of Split Enz alumni. The band reunited in 1993 for their twentieth anniversary tour, when they played Christchurch, Wellington and Auckland supported by The Holy Toledos. They appeared on TV in 2002 to celebrate their thirtieth anniversary. In 2006, Split Enz toured with a membership consisting of the classic 1978–1981 line-up of Tim Finn, Neil Finn, Nigel Griggs, Eddie Rayner, Noel Crombie, and Malcolm Green.

Another reunion tour followed in March 2008, with four shows in New Zealand featuring John Butler Trio drummer Michael Barker in place of Green who was unavailable. A final one-off reunion performance (with Green back on drums) took place on 14 March 2009 as part of the Sound Relief festival.

Members

Latest lineup
Tim Finn – lead vocals, acoustic guitar, piano 
Eddie Rayner – keyboards, piano, backing vocals 
Noel Crombie – percussion, backing vocals 
Malcolm Green – drums, backing vocals 
Nigel Griggs – bass, backing vocals 
Neil Finn – lead guitar, mandolin, vocals

Discography

Studio albums
 Mental Notes (1975)
 Second Thoughts (1976, titled Mental Notes in Europe and North America)
 Dizrythmia (1977)
 Frenzy (1979)
 The Beginning of the Enz (1979, recorded 1973–1974)
 True Colours (1980)
 Waiata (1981, titled Corroboree in Australia)
 Time and Tide (1982)
 Conflicting Emotions (1983)
 See Ya 'Round (1984)

Awards and nominations

ARIA Music Awards
The ARIA Music Awards is an annual awards ceremony that recognises excellence, innovation, and achievement across all genres of Australian music. They commenced in 1987. Split Enz were inducted into the Hall of Fame in 2005.

|-
| ARIA Music Awards of 2005
| Split Enz
| ARIA Hall of Fame
|

TV Week / Countdown Awards
Countdown was an Australian pop music TV series on national broadcaster ABC-TV from 1974 to 1987, it presented music awards from 1979 to 1987, initially in conjunction with magazine TV Week. The TV Week / Countdown Awards were a combination of popular-voted and peer-voted awards.

|-
| rowspan="7" |1980
| rowspan="3" | True Colours
| Best Australian Album
| 
|-
| Most Popular Australian Record
| 
|-
| Best Australian Record Cover Design
| 
|-
| "I Got You"
| Best Single Record
| 
|-
| rowspan="2" | themselves
| Most Outstanding Achievement 
| 
|-
| Most Popular Group
| 
|-
| Neil Finn (Split Enz)
| Best Recorded Song Writer 
| 
|-
| rowspan="3" | 1981
| themselves
| Most Popular Group
| 
|-
| rowspan="2" | Neil Finn (Split Enz)
| Best Australian Songwriter
| 
|-
| Most Popular Male Performer
| 
|-
| rowspan="3" | 1982
| Time and Tide
| Best Australian Album
| 
|-
| "Six Months in a Leaky Boat"
| Best Australian Single
| 
|-
| Themselves
| Most Popular Group
| 
|-
| 1983
| Themselves
| Most Popular Group
| 
|-

References

Bibliography
 Chunn, Mike. Stranger Than Fiction: The Life and Times of Split Enz. GP Publications, 1992. 
 Chunn, Mike. Stranger Than Fiction: The Life and Times of Split Enz (revised ebook edition). Hurricane Press, 2013. 
 Dix, John. Stranded in Paradise: New Zealand Rock and Roll, 1955 to the Modern Era. Penguin Books, 2005. 
 Green, Peter. Letters to My Frenz. Rocket Pocket Books, 2006. 
 Green, Peter, and Goulding, Mark, Wings Off Flies. Rocket Pocket Books, 2002.

External links

 Split Enz Collection at the Performing Arts Collection, Arts Centre Melbourne
 AudioCulture
 
 

 
APRA Award winners
Musical groups established in 1971
Musical groups disestablished in 1984
Musical groups reestablished in 2008
New Zealand pop music groups
New Zealand rock music groups
New Zealand progressive rock groups
New Zealand new wave musical groups
ARIA Award winners
ARIA Hall of Fame inductees
A&M Records artists
Chrysalis Records artists
Mushroom Records artists
Articles which contain graphical timelines
Art rock musical groups
New Zealand expatriates in Australia
New Zealand expatriates in England
1970s in New Zealand music
1980s in New Zealand music
Sibling musical groups
Musical groups from Auckland
New Zealand pop rock groups
New Zealand post-punk music groups